Pig Boy (2011) is a crime novel by Australian author J. C. Burke. It won the 2012 Ned Kelly Award.

Plot summary

Damon Styles is expelled from school on his eighteenth birthday.  He gets himself a firearms licence and intends to get a job shooting pigs with Pigman. But Damon harbours secrets and the citizens of the town of Strathven believe they know what Damon is planning and set out to stop him.

Reviews

Holly Harper for Readings hadn't "been this impressed with a main character in quite some time" and thought the author "has created an absolutely unforgettable cast of characters".

Awards and nominations

 2011 longlisted Inky Awards — Gold Inky 
 2012 winner Ned Kelly Award — Best Novel 
 2012 shortlisted Davitt Award — Best Young Adult Book

References

2011 Australian novels
Australian crime novels
Ned Kelly Award-winning works
Random House books